The 2011–12 Colorado Buffaloes men's basketball team represented the University of Colorado in the 2011–12 NCAA Division I men's basketball season. Head coach Tad Boyle was in his second season at Colorado. This was their first year as members of the Pac-12 Conference. They finished the regular season with 24–12 overall, 11–7 in Pac-12 play. They won the 2012 Pac-12 Conference men's basketball tournament and earned a trip to the 2012 NCAA Division I men's basketball tournament with an 11 seed in south. They defeated UNLV in the second round before they lost to Baylor in the third round.

Roster

Schedule
 
|-
!colspan=9| Regular season

|-
!colspan=9| Pac-12 tournament

|-
!colspan=9| 2012 NCAA tournament

References

Colorado
Colorado Buffaloes men's basketball seasons
Colorado
Colorado Buffaloes men's basketball
Colorado Buffaloes men's basketball
Pac-12 Conference men's basketball tournament championship seasons